The Daimler D.I (also known by the company designation L6) was a German fighter aircraft of World War I. It was a conventional biplane design with a very small interplane gap - the top wing nearly touched the top of the fuselage. Power was provided by a Daimler D.IIIb water-cooled V-8 engine.

Design and development
The L6 prototype competed in the second Idflieg competition for a new fighter design in 1918.  The competition was held at Adlershof from 22 May through 21 June.  This resulted in an order for 20 aircraft being placed.

History
Production commenced in 1918.  Six examples were built by the time of the Armistice, at which time production was abandoned.

Specifications (D.I)

References

Further reading

 

 

1910s German fighter aircraft
D1
Biplanes
Single-engined tractor aircraft
Aircraft first flown in 1918